Mimi Chan (born in Boston, MA) is an American martial arts instructor and performer.

Early life 
Chan moved with her family from Boston, MA to Orlando, FL, in 1980, where her training in martial arts began under her father, Pui Chan. Upon the family's move to Orlando, her father built the Wah Lum Temple, the first traditional Chinese martial arts temple to be built in the United States. By the age of 5, Chan was already performing in local exhibitions.  She specialized in Kung Fu, open hand and weaponry.

Chan has won Grand Champion Titles and gold medals in multiple international martial arts tournaments, in which she was undefeated. She was also featured in articles in Kung Fu Magazine, and entered the Martial Arts Hall of Fame deemed "Woman of the Year" by Inside Kung Fu Magazine in 1999.

Education 
Chan earned a Bachelor of Science in Marketing and Business Administration from the University of Central Florida in 1999.

Film and television appearances and Mulan 
Chan's performed in exhibitions at (MGM, EPCOT, Universal Studios, and Splendid China). She was chosen as the model and martial arts video reference for Disney’s animated feature, Mulan. Character drawing sessions and live-action video reference shooting was done over the course of three years. Chan’s cousin, George Kee, was chosen to play the part of Captain Shang Li. Together, they choreographed fight sequences for the film's song “I’ll Make a Man Out of You” and the film's end finale. She worked with supervising animator Mark Henn. She has also appeared in television shows and worked with Hong Kong stunt teams.

Film directing and producing 
In 2011, Chan directed and produced a documentary about her father’s life, Pui Chan: Kung Fu Pioneer. The film world premiered in 2012 at the Central Florida Film Festival where it won two awards, "Best Documentary" and "Audience Choice."

References

External links 
 Official site

Living people
American wushu practitioners
University of Central Florida alumni
People from Boston
People from Orlando, Florida
Year of birth missing (living people)